Sodium dichromate is the inorganic compound with the formula Na2Cr2O7. However, the salt is usually handled as its dihydrate Na2Cr2O7·2H2O. Virtually all chromium ore is processed via conversion to sodium dichromate and virtually all compounds and materials based on chromium are prepared from this salt. In terms of reactivity and appearance, sodium dichromate and potassium dichromate are very similar. The sodium salt is, however, around twenty times more soluble in water than the potassium salt (49 g/L at 0 °C) and its equivalent weight is also lower, which is often desirable.

Preparation
Sodium dichromate is generated on a large scale from ores containing chromium(III) oxides.  The ore is fused with a base, typically sodium carbonate, at around 1000 °C in the presence of air (source of oxygen):

 2Cr2O3 +  4Na2CO3  +  3O2   ->   4Na2CrO4 +  4CO2

This step solubilizes the chromium and allows it to be extracted into hot water.  At this stage, other components of the ore such as aluminium and iron compounds, are poorly soluble.  Acidification of the resulting aqueous extract with sulfuric acid or carbon dioxide affords the dichromate:

 2Na2CrO4 +  2CO2 +  H2O   ->   Na2Cr2O7  +  2NaHCO3 

 2Na2CrO4 +  H2SO4   ->   Na2Cr2O7  +  Na2SO4 + H2O 

The dichromate is isolated as the dihydrate by crystallization.  In this way, many millions of kilograms of sodium dichromate are produced annually.

Since chromium(VI) is toxic, especially as the dust, such factories are subject to stringent regulations.  For example, effluent from such refineries is treated with reducing agents to return any chromium(VI) to chromium(III), which is less threatening to the environment.  A variety of hydrates of this salt are known, ranging from the decahydrate below 19.5 °C (CAS# ) as well as hexa-, tetra-, and dihydrates.  Above 62 °C, these salts lose water spontaneously to give the anhydrous material.
It is crystallised around 30 to 35 degrees C

Reactions
Dichromate and chromate salts are oxidizing agents.  For the tanning of leather, sodium dichromate is first reduced with sulfur dioxide.

In the area of organic synthesis, this compound oxidizes benzylic and allylic C-H bonds to carbonyl derivatives. For example, 2,4,6-trinitrotoluene is oxidized to the corresponding carboxylic acid.  Similarly,  2,3-dimethylnaphthalene is oxidized by Na2Cr2O7 to 2,3-naphthalenedicarboxylic acid.

Secondary alcohols are oxidized to the corresponding ketone, e.g. menthol to menthone; dihydrocholesterol to cholestanone:
3 R2CHOH  +  Cr2O72−  +  2 H+ →  3 R2C=O  +  Cr2O3 +  4 H2O
Relative to the potassium salt, the main advantage of sodium dichromate is its greater solubility in water and polar solvents like acetic acid.

Sodium dichromate can be used in fluorene to fluorenone conversion.

Safety
Like all hexavalent chromium compounds, sodium dichromate is carcinogenic. The compound is also corrosive and exposure may produce severe eye damage or blindness. Human exposure further encompasses impaired fertility, heritable genetic damage and harm to unborn children.

References

Sodium compounds
Dichromates
Oxidizing agents